Fiona Lazaar (born 19 September 1985) is a French politician of The New Democrats who was elected to the French National Assembly on 18 June 2017 as a member of La République En Marche! (LREM), representing Val-d'Oise's 5th constituency.

Political career
In parliament, Lazaar serves on the Committee on Foreign Affairs. In addition to her committee assignments, she is a member of the French-Singaporean Parliamentary Friendship Group.

From October 2018 to September 2020, Lazaar served as one of five deputy chairpersons of the LREM parliamentary group, under the leadership of chairman Gilles Le Gendre. In July 2019, she stood as a candidate for the chairmanship of the Committee on Social Affairs; she was defeated in the second round by the incumbent chairwoman, Brigitte Bourguignon.

In addition to her parliamentary work, Lazaar was appointed by Prime Minister Édouard Philippe to chair the National Council against Poverty and Social Exclusion (CNLE) in 2020.

Lazaar was one of the founding members of The New Democrats in 2020.

Political positions

Domestic policy
Within LREM, Lazaar aligned with Aurélien Taché, Laetitia Avia and few others in challenging secularism. 

In 2020, Lazaar went against her parliamentary group's majority and abstained from an important vote on a much discussed security bill drafted by her colleagues Alice Thourot and Jean-Michel Fauvergue that helped, among other measures, curtail the filming of police forces.

Economic policy
In July 2019, Lazaar voted in favor of the French ratification of the European Union’s Comprehensive Economic and Trade Agreement (CETA) with Canada.

See also
 2017 French legislative election

References

1985 births
Living people
Deputies of the 15th National Assembly of the French Fifth Republic
La République En Marche! politicians
New Democrats politicians
21st-century French women politicians
Place of birth missing (living people)
Women members of the National Assembly (France)
Members of Parliament for Val-d'Oise